Teton County is a county in the U.S. state of Wyoming. As of the 2020 United States Census, the population was 23,331. Its county seat is Jackson. Its west boundary line is also the Wyoming state boundary shared with Idaho and the southern tip of Montana. Teton County is part of the Jackson, WY-ID Micropolitan Statistical Area. Teton County contains the Jackson Hole ski area, all of Grand Teton National Park, and 40.4% of Yellowstone National Park's total area, including over 96.6% of its water area (largely in Yellowstone Lake).

Previously a staunchly Republican county, which produced Governor and U.S. Senator Clifford Hansen, Teton has become the most Democratic county in Wyoming, following a broader national trend of affluent and college-educated voters drifting towards the political party. In 2020, Joe Biden beat Donald Trump 67.10% to 29.58% in Teton, an overwhelming margin that was the most for a Democrat ever in the county.

History
Teton County was created February 15, 1921, from a portion of Lincoln County. Its governing organization was completed in 1922. The county was named for the Teton Range. The county was created because the inhabitants lived too far away from Kemmerer, the county seat of Lincoln County. The creation of the county required a special act of the Wyoming Legislature, because the area was too poor and had too few people to qualify for county status under the normal requirements. Unlike the rest of the state, it has been one of the very few counties in Wyoming to vote for Democratic candidates in recent presidential elections.

Geography

Adjacent counties

 Park County – northeast
 Fremont County – east
 Sublette County – southeast
 Lincoln County – south
 Bonneville County, Idaho – southwest
 Teton County, Idaho – southwest
 Fremont County, Idaho – west
 Gallatin County, Montana – northwest

National protected areas

 Bridger-Teton National Forest (part)
 Caribou-Targhee National Forest (part)
 Grand Teton National Park
 John D. Rockefeller Memorial Parkway
 National Elk Refuge
 Shoshone National Forest (part)
 Yellowstone National Park (part)

Demographics

2000 census
As of the 2000 United States Census there were 18,251 people, 7,688 households, and 4,174 families in the county. The population density was 5 people per square mile (2/km2). There were 10,267 housing units at an average density of 3 per square mile (1/km2). The racial makeup of the county was 93.59% White, 0.15% Black or African American, 0.53% Native American, 0.54% Asian, 0.03% Pacific Islander, 3.93% from other races, and 1.22% from two or more races. 6.49% of the population were Hispanic or Latino of any race. 19.2% were of German, 14.2% English, 11.7% Irish and 6.7% American ancestry.

There were 7,688 households, out of which 25.60% had children under the age of 18 living with them, 45.30% were married couples living together, 5.70% had a female householder with no husband present, and 45.70% were non-families. 27.30% of all households were made up of individuals, and 3.70% had someone living alone who was 65 years of age or older. The average household size was 2.36 and the average family size was 2.89.

The county population contained 19.90% under the age of 18, 9.80% from 18 to 24, 38.30% from 25 to 44, 25.00% from 45 to 64, and 6.90% who were 65 years of age or older. The median age was 35 years. For every 100 females, there were 114.30 males. For every 100 females age 18 and over, there were 115.50 males.

The median income for a household in the county was $54,614, and the median income for a family was $63,916. Males had a median income of $34,570 versus $29,132 for females. The per capita income for the county was $38,260. About 2.80% of families and 6.00% of the population were below the poverty line, including 5.70% of those under age 18 and 4.40% of those age 65 or over.

2010 census
As of the 2010 United States Census, there were 21,294 people, 8,973 households, and 4,938 families in the county. The racial makeup of the county was 88.4% white, 1.1% Asian, 0.5% American Indian, 0.2% black or African American, 0.1% Pacific islander, 8.1% from other races, and 1.6% from two or more races. Those of Hispanic or Latino origin made up 15.0% of the population. In terms of ancestry, 22.2% were German, 14.9% were English, 13.0% were Irish, and 11.1% were American.

Of the 8,973 households, 25.5% had children under the age of 18 living with them, 45.7% were married couples living together, 5.6% had a female householder with no husband present, 45.0% were non-families, and 29.2% of all households were made up of individuals. The average household size was 2.34 and the average family size was 2.89. The median age was 36.9 years.

The median income for a household in the county was $70,271 and the median income for a family was $90,596. Males had a median income of $40,594 versus $36,715 for females. The per capita income for the county was $42,224. About 5.1% of families and 8.2% of the population were below the poverty line, including 15.5% of those under age 18 and 0.8% of those age 65 or over.

Economy

A 2019 Bloomberg L.P. report (citing Bureau of Economic Analysis figures) found that Teton had the highest average incomes per capita of any county in the United States, at $252,000. This was partly attributed to the high incomes of Jackson Hole residents, where property owners include Bill Gates.

As of the fourth quarter of 2021, the median home price in Teton County was $1,060,093, an increase of 17.8% from the prior year.

Communities

Town
 Jackson (county seat)

Census-designated places

 Alta
 Hoback
 Kelly
 Moose Wilson Road
 Rafter J Ranch
 South Park
 Teton Village
 Wilson

Unincorporated communities
 Moran
 Moose

Politics
Liz Skalka of the Huffpost described Teton as a "liberal county" in August 2022. Previously a staunchly Republican county, which produced Governor and U.S. Senator Clifford Hansen, Teton has become the most Democratic county in Wyoming, which is one of the most Republican states in the nation. The only Republican presidential candidate since 1992 to win Teton County was George W. Bush in 2000 who had county resident Dick Cheney on the ticket. In the 2008 election, Barack Obama carried Teton County by a 23.6 percentage point margin over John McCain, with McCain winning statewide by a 32.2 percentage point margin over Obama, his widest margin in any state. Albany County, which includes the University of Wyoming at Laramie, was the only other county in the state to have backed Obama. In 2004, Teton was the only Wyoming county won by John F. Kerry over George W. Bush. In the 2016 election, Hillary Clinton beat Donald Trump by 57.9%–31.1%. In 2020, Joe Biden beat Donald Trump by 37.5%, the largest margin for a Democrat ever in the county. The county has, however, voted at times for Republican candidates for the governorship and United States Senate.

See also
 National Register of Historic Places listings in Teton County, Wyoming
Wyoming
List of cities and towns in Wyoming
List of counties in Wyoming
Wyoming statistical areas

References

Further reading

 Farrell, Justin. Billionaire wilderness: the ultra-wealthy and the remaking of the American West (Princeton UP, 2020) online review

External links

 
1922 establishments in Wyoming
Jackson, Wyoming micropolitan area
Populated places established in 1922